The R523 is a Regional Route in South Africa.

Route
It is the more southern of two parallel east-west routes, the other being the R523. Its western origin is a point on the R521 road between Alldays and Polokwane (Pietersburg), and from there it runs to the N1 at Louis Trichardt.

References

Regional Routes in Limpopo